Sunny Kapicadu is a writer-activist from Kottayam, Kerala, India. He has taken an active part in numerous protests in the state of Kerala related to the issues faced by the Dalit communities and has been vocal about the marginalization of the downtrodden. He is an LIC employee by profession. He is a famous Dalit thinker and orator in Kerala and his speeches are popular on Social media portals like YouTube.

Personal life 
Kapicadu hails from Kottayam. He is an alumnus of SMV, NSS, HSS, Kallara, and Mahatma Gandhi University. There was a death threat against him by a Bharatiya Janata Party worker from Thiruvananthapuram in 2019.

Position on issues and activism 
Kapicadu vehemently criticised the move of Left Democratic Front government in Kerala to give Reservation for Economically Weaker Section among higher caste. He said such a move is unconstitutional.

He expressed solidarity with the Entry of women to Sabarimala verdict by Supreme Court of India and called protests against the court verdicts as anti-woman and anti-Dalit. He also called those protests as Mutiny by the Malayali Shudras. He had also pitched for burial grounds for Dalit.

Notable works

References

Year of birth missing (living people)
Living people
Activists from Kerala
Mahatma Gandhi University, Kerala alumni
Writers from Kerala